Joaquín Ibáñez may refer to:

 Joaquín Ibáñez (footballer, born 1995), Argentine defender for Chacarita Juniors
 Joaquín Ibáñez (footballer, born 1996), Argentine midfielder for Arsenal de Sarandí